In basketball, a free throw is an unopposed attempt to score points from behind the free throw line. The National Basketball Association's (NBA) free throw percentage leader is the player with the highest free throw percentage in a given season. José Calderón holds the record for best free throw percentage in a season, which he accomplished with the Toronto Raptors in the 2008–09 NBA season with .9805 percent, missing only 3 free throws that season. To qualify as a free throw percentage leader, the player must have at least 125 free throws made. Aside from the strike shortened 1998–99 and 2011–12 seasons, this has been the entry criteria since the 1974–75 season. Bill Sharman has been the free throw percentage leader a league-best 7 times, followed by Rick Barry (6), Reggie Miller (5), Stephen Curry (4), and Larry Bird (4).

Key

Annual leaders

Notes

References
General

Specific

National Basketball Association lists
National Basketball Association statistical leaders